Rodney Roy Jerkins (born July 29, 1977), also known by his stage name Darkchild, is an American record producer, rapper, and songwriter. He has collaborated with a broad range of popular artists.

Jerkins has won multiple Grammy Awards. Among his most successful productions are "The Boy Is Mine" and "What About Us?" by Brandy, "I Can Love You" and "Enough Cryin" by Mary J. Blige, "Daydreamin'" by Tatyana Ali, "Angel of Mine" by Monica, "It's Not Right but It's Okay" by Whitney Houston, "Say My Name" and "Cater 2 U" by Destiny's Child, "If You Had My Love" by Jennifer Lopez, "He Wasn't Man Enough" by Toni Braxton, "You Rock My World" by Michael Jackson, "One Wish" by Ray J, "Déjà Vu" by Beyoncé, "Telephone" by Lady Gaga, "As Long as You Love Me" by Justin Bieber and "You're Mine (Eternal)" by Mariah Carey.

Early life
Jerkins' father, Frederick, is an Evangelical pastor and his mother was an housekeeper. Jerkins began playing piano at age five. He would follow his brother and father, who both played at church gatherings. 

Raised in Galloway Township, New Jersey, Jerkins is one of four children: two boys and two girls. His brother is fellow producer Fred Jerkins III. Jerkins attended Absegami High School, and identifies as a Christian.

At age 13, he was offered a chance to work at a studio in Atlantic City, New Jersey, but declined. At age 14, Jerkins was mentored by his idol, Teddy Riley, but he did not accept a contract offer to work with the producer due to an aspiration to build an "empire" without such support. He was also offered a chance to work at Bad Boy Records, but declined. At 16, he was approached by James Jones, formerly of Uptown Records, and moved in with him to Hackensack, New Jersey to work with him. One of their first sessions was with Patti LaBelle.

Career
Jerkins' first recorded output was a "gospel rap" collaboration with his brother, Fred Jerkins III, entitled On the Move. He later incorporated the name "Darkchild", at the age of 17, subsequently accepting a worldwide publishing deal with the EMI Music Corporation. The producer then proceeded to establish a commercial music career, initially working with artists such as Joe, Mary J. Blige and Brandy. Jerkins' stated his first big projects were Blige's Share My World, Whitney Houston's It's Not Right but It's Okay, and Brandy and Monica's The Boy Is Mine.

Over the course of his career, Jerkins has developed a "camp" of successful topline writers, including LaShawn Daniels, Kenisha Pratt, Toni Estes, Anesha & Antea Birchett, Delisha Thomas, Marvin Hemmings, Kalenna Harper, Keli Nicole Price, Nora Payne, Michaela Shiloh, Isaac Phillips, Japhe Tejeda, LeToya Duggan, Mischke Butler, Andre Lindal, and Victoria Monét, among others.

Production
Jerkins has produced and written for Brandy, Patti LaBelle, Joe, The Saturdays, Toni Braxton, Vanessa Williams, Will Smith, Keyshia Cole, Monica, Michael Jackson, Ayumi Hamasaki, Cher, Jessica Simpson, Jennifer Lopez, Ashanti,  Aaliyah, Amerie, Britney Spears, Mary Mary, Kirk Franklin, Kierra Sheard, The Black Eyed Peas, Destiny's Child, Spice Girls, TLC, Janet Jackson, Danity Kane, Beyoncé, Linda Király, Lady Gaga, Cascada, Tamia, Pussycat Dolls, Whitney Houston, Natasha Bedingfield, Mary J. Blige, B5, Lionel Richie, Tiffany Evans, JYJ, Wonder Girls, Austin Brown, Kanye West, Katy Perry, Hikaru Utada, Keke Palmer, Hala Al Turk, Nelly Furtado, Justin Bieber, Brian McKnight and LMFAO.

In the 2010s, he produced songs for Mariah Carey, Leona Lewis, JLS, Kylie Minogue, Ayumi Hamasaki, The Saturdays. Jerkins was a music executive and mentor on season 10 of American Idol.

In 2013, Jerkins was hired on to be a producer for Michael Jackson's posthumous album Xscape. He originally worked on the title track for the album from 1999 to 2001. He is the only producer to work on the original version and reworking version of the title track.

When asked by Ryan Seacrest in 2013 the favourite people he's produced for he said "Definitely The Saturdays. Without a doubt. I had a lot of fun working with them and was really impressed with their voices. They were very down to earth and I like that a lot in an artist. I wish them all the best in America and think they could end up as big as The Spice Girls."

In preparation for the 2014 FIFA World Cup opening ceremony, Jerkins produced a song featuring the Palestinian 2013 Arab Idol winner Mohammed Assaf.

In 2017, he produced Blind and Makings of You for Tamar Braxton.

Record labels
In 1999, Jerkins joined Sony/Epic Records to promote power vocalist Rhona, Pop/R&B girl group So Plush and rapper Fats. Fats appeared on two tracks Jerkins produced for Michael Jackson's album Invincible, and So Plush released the single "Things I've Heard Before". Subsequently, So Plush's singles, "Damn" and "Things I've Heard Before", were pressed and made available as promos, and Rhona's album was even released in Japan. In 2005 Darkchild Records reappeared when Jerkins signed brand new acts including Shamari Fears, formerly of R&B group Blaque, female MC Asia Lee, dancehall artist Atiba, crossover act Natasha Bradley, and gospel singer Anesha Birchett.

In 2006, he was appointed VP of Artists & repertoire (A&R) for The Island Def Jam Group. Jerkins released his wife Joy Enriquez's second album Atmosphere of Heaven, which features a religious direction, on his independent gospel imprint JoyFul Child Records. The Darkchild name has been loaned to Darkchild Gospel, a record company run by Jerkins' brother, Fred Jerkins III. which released the latest album from Virtue – Testimony.

Music Mogul, Inc.
In late 2008, Jerkins joined Nicholas Longano, Ray Brown, and Jonathan E. Eubanks in creating Music Mogul, Inc. MusicMogul.com is an online portal where artists can communicate with their fans. Each quarter, members vote for the best video performances. The top performers are then flown to Los Angeles to compete in front of a panel of celebrity judges. The winner gets a demo deal with Darkchild Productions.

Personal life
Jerkins has been married to singer Joy Enriquez since April 4, 2004. The two met when he worked on her debut album.

The couple has four children.  Rodney David Jerkins Jr(28 May 2008); Heavenly Joy Jerkins(17 November 17 2009); Hannah Joy Jerkins(19 October 2012); and Royal David Jerkins, in early 2015.

In 2015, his five-year-old daughter Heavenly Joy was a contestant on season 10 of America's Got Talent.

Singles discography

Appearances and production discography

Notable productions
 1995: Intro - "Strung Out On Your Lovin'"
 1996: Aaliyah - "Everything's Gonna Be Alright"
 1997: No Authority - “Don’t Stop”
 1998: Brandy and Monica – "The Boy Is Mine"
 1998: Brandy – "Angel in Disguise"
 1998: Monica – "Angel of Mine"
 1998: Whitney Houston – "It's Not Right but It's Okay"
 1999: Destiny's Child – "Say My Name"
 1999: Jennifer Lopez – "If You Had My Love"
 2000: Toni Braxton – "He Wasn't Man Enough"
 2000: Spice Girls – "Holler"
 2001: Michael Jackson – "You Rock My World"
 2001: Michael Jackson - “Unbreakable”
 2001: Britney Spears – "Overprotected" (The Darkchild Remix)
 2001: Jessica Simpson – "I Never"
 2001: Jessica Simpson – "Imagination" 
 2002: Brandy – "What About Us?"
 2002: Monica – "All Eyez on Me"
 2002: TLC – "Turntable"
 2004: Destiny's Child – "Lose My Breath"
 2005: Destiny's Child – "Cater 2 U"
 2006: Beyoncé (featuring Jay-Z) – "Déjà Vu"
 2006: Ciara (featuring 50 Cent) – "Can't Leave 'em Alone"
 2008: Tiffany Evans (featuring Bow Wow) - "I'm Grown"
 2008: Janet Jackson – "Feedback"
 2008: Brandy – "Right Here (Departed)"
 2008: The Pussycat Dolls – "When I Grow Up"
 2008: Beyoncé – "Scared of Lonely"
 2009: Lady Gaga featuring Beyoncé – "Telephone"
 2011: The Black Eyed Peas – "Just Can't Get Enough"
 2011: Kelly Rowland  (featuring Lil' Playy)- "Work It Man"
 2012: Justin Bieber – "As Long as You Love Me"
 2012: Leona Lewis – "Shake You Up"
 2014: Mariah Carey – "You're Mine (Eternal)"
 2014: Mary J. Blige – "A Night To Remember"
 2014: Sam Smith – "Stay with Me"
 2014: Michael Jackson - “Xscape”
 2017: Tamar Braxton – "Blind"
 2018: Chromeo (featuring French Montana and Stefflon Don) - "Don't Sleep"
 2017: Tamar Braxton – "The Makings Of You"
 2019: Baekhyun - "Diamond"
 2021: NCT 127 - "Favorite (Vampire)"
 2022: SZA - "Shirt"
 2023: Kali Uchis - "Endlessly"

Guest raps
 1995: Hodge – "Head Nod" (Darkchild Remix)
 1996: New Edition with AZ – "Something About You" (Darkchild Remix)
 1997: Tasha Holiday – "Just The Way You Like It" (Darkchild Remix) with Lil' Cease, Peter Gunz and Mike Nitty
 1997: MQ3 – "Everyday"
 1997: Immature – "I Can't Wait" with Mike Nitty
 1997: Mary J. Blige – "Everything" (Darkchild Remix) with Fat Joe
 1997: K-Ball – "On the Weekend", "Love Matters"
 1998: Kirk Franklin & The Nu Nation Project – "Revolution"
 1998: Keith Washington – "Bring It On" (Darkchild Remix)
 1999: Brandy – "Top of the World" (Darkchild Remix) with Fat Joe and Big Pun
 2000: Natalie Wilson & The S.O.P. Chorale – "Act Like You Know" with LaShawn Daniels
 2001: So Plush – "What You Do to Me" with 50 Cent and Fats, "Ain't My Fault"
 2001: Rhona – "Satisfied" (Another Darkchild Remix) with Fats
 2002: Jay Mathis – "Kiss" with Pain and Fats
 2002: Mary Mary – "He Said" with Fats
 2002: K-Young – "Ballinest Player" with Lil' Zal
 2002: K-Young – "Ooh Wee"
 2002: Shawn Desman – "Sexy"
 2003: Natalie Wilson & The S.O.P. Chorale – "Good Life"
 2004: Kierra "Kiki" Sheard – "You Don't Know"
 2005: Joy Enriquez – "Don't You Let Go"
 2005: Anesha Birchett – "Get Ready" with Mase
 2005: Atiba – "Flossin" with Francisco
 2006: The Darkchild Allstars – "We Are Family"
 2007: Linda Király - "Can't Let Go"
 2008: The Pussycat Dolls With Diddy, Lil Wayne, & Fatman Scoop – "When I Grow Up" (Darkchild Remix)
 2008: Lady Gaga - "Reloaded" (unreleased song)

Unreleased tracks
 1999: Destiny's Child - “Life Like This”
 1999: Michael Jackson - “Rampage”
 1999: Michael Jackson - “A Deeper Love”
 2000: Destiny's Child - “Girl Like Me”
 2000: Destiny's Child - “Everything”
 2001: Michael Jackson - “Cheater” (Reworked)
 2001: Michael Jackson - “Chicago 1945” (Reworked)
 2001: Michael Jackson - “Get Around”
 2001: Michael Jackson - “Get Your Weight Of Off Me”
 2001: Michael Jackson - “Kick It”
 2001: Michael Jackson - “Maybe We Can Do It”
 2001: Michael Jackson - “Pressure”
 2001: Michael Jackson - “Seduction”
 2001: Michael Jackson - “The Pain”
 2011: Jennifer Lopez - "This Cannot Be Love"

Video cameos
 1995: Hodge – "Head Nod" (Darkchild Remix)
 1996: Gina Thompson (featuring Missy Elliott) – "The Things That U Do (Bad Boy Remix)"
 1997: No Authority – "Don't Stop"
 1998: Kirk Franklin & The Nu Nation Project – "Revolution"
 1998: J'Son - I Should've Cheat on You
 2000: So Plush – "Things I've Heard Before"
 2001: Rhona – "Satisfied"
 2002: Brandy – "What About Us?"
 2002: Monica – "All Eyez on Me"
 2006: Natasha – "Hey, Hey, Hey" and "So Sick"
 2006: Shareefa – "Cry No More"
 2006: J. Holiday – "Be with Me"
 2008: Brandy – "Right Here (Departed)"

Web series
Jerkins is currently starring with Johnny Wright in a number of episodes of the YOBI.tv Take the Stage web series.

References

External links
 Rodney Jerkins on Beatbuggy
 Ebony Magazine Interview
 [ AllHipHop.com Interview]
 MixOnline Technical Interview
 Darkchild official website
 MySpace Page of Darkchild Music
 Fred Jerkins' Darkchild Gospel
 Darkchild Fansite (inc. discography)
 Thermal Soundwaves Show interview
 Le groupe SoulRnB.com consacré à Rodney "Darkchild" Jerkins

Living people
African-American record producers
African-American songwriters
American electronic musicians
American hip hop record producers
American pop keyboardists
Grammy Award winners
Musicians from New Jersey
Absegami High School alumni
People from Pleasantville, New Jersey
People from Galloway Township, New Jersey
Songwriters from New Jersey
21st-century American keyboardists
1977 births
21st-century African-American musicians
20th-century African-American people